Let's Spend the Night Together is a live concert film, documenting the Rolling Stones' 1981 North American Tour. It was directed by Hal Ashby, and released to cinemas on Friday, February 11, 1983.

It was subsequently released on VHS,Betamax,Laserdisc,VHD and CED Videodisc. It was released in New Zealand and Australia with the alternative title Time Is on Our Side on VHS and is currently available on DVD in Japan, Australia and New Zealand (as L.S.T.N.T from Studio Canal/Universal).

It was filmed at the Brendan Byrne Arena in East Rutherford, New Jersey (5–6 November 1981) and at Sun Devil Stadium in Tempe, Arizona (13 December 1981).

The film was released as Rocks Off in Germany in 1982 with slightly different footage and the additional song "When the Whip Comes Down" (following "Under My Thumb") from Sun Devil Stadium.

See also the live album Still Life, released in 1982, from the same tour.

Lions Gate Entertainment released the film on DVD in the United States on November 2, 2010.

Track listing
 "Under My Thumb" – 
 "Let's Spend the Night Together" – 
 "Shattered" – 
 "Neighbours" – 
 "Black Limousine" – 
 "Just My Imagination (Running Away with Me)" – 
 "Twenty Flight Rock" – 
 "Let Me Go" – 
 "Time Is on My Side" – 
 "Beast of Burden" – 
 "Waiting on a Friend" – 
 "Going to a Go-Go" – 
 "You Can't Always Get What You Want" – 
 "Little T&A" – 
 "Tumbling Dice" – 
 "She's So Cold" – 
 "All Down the Line" – 
 "Hang Fire" – 
 "Miss You" – 
 "Let It Bleed" – 
 "Start Me Up" – 
 "Honky Tonk Women" – 
 "Brown Sugar" – 
 "Jumpin' Jack Flash" – 
 "Satisfaction" – 
 "Outro: Star Spangled Banner" Trad. (arr. Jimi Hendrix)

Personnel
The Rolling Stones
 Mick Jagger – lead vocals, guitar
 Keith Richards – guitar, vocals
 Ronnie Wood – guitar, backing vocals
 Charlie Watts – drums
 Bill Wyman – bass guitar

Additional musicians
 Ian McLagan – organ
 Ian Stewart – piano
 Ernie Watts – saxophone, tambourine
 Bobby Keys – saxophone

See also
 Still Life

References

External links
 
 
 

Let's Spend The Night Together (film)
Films directed by Hal Ashby
1983 films
Concert films
1983 live albums
1983 video albums
Live video albums
The Rolling Stones live albums
Films shot in Arizona
Films shot in New Jersey
The Rolling Stones films
1980s English-language films
1980s British films